The 1993 Canoe Slalom World Cup was a series of five races in 4 canoeing and kayaking categories organized by the International Canoe Federation (ICF). It was the 6th edition. The series consisted of 4 regular world cup races and the world cup final.

Calendar

Final standings 

The winner of each world cup race was awarded 25 points. The points scale reached down to 1 point for 15th place. Only the best two results of each athlete from the first 4 world cups plus the result from the world cup final counted for the final world cup standings. Furthermore, an athlete or boat had to compete in the world cup final and two other world cup races in order to be classified in the world cup rankings. If two or more athletes or boats were equal on points, the ranking was determined by their positions in the world cup final.

Results

World Cup Race 1 

The first world cup race of the season took place at the Segre Olympic Park in La Seu d'Urgell from 17 to 18 July.

World Cup Race 2 

The second world cup race of the season took place in Lofer, Austria from 23 to 25 July.

World Cup Race 3 

The third world cup race of the season took place at the Augsburg Eiskanal from 31 July to 1 August.

World Cup Race 4 
The fourth world cup race of the season took place at the Minden Wild Water Preserve in Ontario from 20 to 21 August.

World Cup Final 

The final world cup race of the season took place at the Ocoee Whitewater Center from 30 to 31 August.

References

External links 
 International Canoe Federation

Canoe Slalom World Cup
1993 in canoeing